Arunabha Sengupta (born Kolkata, India, 13 June 1973) is an Indian sports writer and novelist. 

He has written three non-fiction volumes on cricket history with a socio-political perspective as well as four novels and one collection of short stories. He is a cricket historian and a Cricket Writer at CricketCountry.com and Scoreline.org

Books
 Elephant in the Stadium Pitch Publishing  May 2022  

- The story of India's epochal Test series win in England in 1971. With the series as the main theme, the book is also a look at the complex relationship between India and Britain through the days of colonial rule to the modern day. It has an introduction by Mihir Bose

This was shortlisted for the Derek Hodgson Cricket Writers' Club Book of the Year Award 2022.

The title was also listed as one of The Times' Best Sports Books of 2022. Alyson Rudd, chairperson of the William Hill Sports Book of the Year Award, adjudged it to be the best cricket book of 2022. She wrote: "It was a quiet year for cricket books, but arguably the best is Elephant in the Stadium, by Arunabha Sengupta, which is a social history and as much about the legacy of colonialism as it is about India’s first Test series win in England in 1971."

The book was also longlisted for the MCC Cricket Society Book of the Year Award 2023 

 The Ashes: This Thing Can Be Done CricketMASH Mar 2022  

- A history of The Ashes in a graphic novel format. It is co-written with artist and sports-illustrator Maha and has an introduction by Stephen Chalke

 Sachin and Azhar in Cape Town co-written with Abhishek Mukherjee Pitch Publishing  Jan 2021  

- India and South Africa, the countries and their cricket, through the prism of the incredible partnership between Tendulkar and Azharuddin in the Newlands Test of 1997. It has an introduction by Harsha Bhogle

 Apartheid: A Point to Cover CricketMASH May 2020  

- A history of South African cricket during the apartheid era 1948-1970 leading up to the Stop The Seventy Tour campaign. It has an introduction by Peter Hain

 Sherlock Holmes and the Birth of The Ashes Best Mysteries August 2015  

- A Sherlock Holmes pastiche involving the legendary fictional detective in the backdrop of the epochal 1882 Test match at The Oval. This was shortlisted for the Cricket Society and MCC Book of the Year Award in 2016. This was republished by Max Books in 2016 

 The Best Seller Createspace November 2010 

- A novel set in Amsterdam, dealing with, among others, the travels and travails of a struggling writer in the murky publishing world. ForeWord Reviews rated the novel 5 stars.

 Big Apple 2 Bites (Frog Books, Mumbai March 2007)  
- a novel combining the worlds of Software, Love and Aikido and set against the backdrop of 9/11. (The author himself is a first dan black belt in Kobayashi Aikido.)

 Bowled Over - Stories Between the Covers

Both Labyrinth and Bowled Over were listed in  the Journal of Commonwealth Literature

 Labyrinth - a novel about the Software Industry (iUniverse, Inc. June 5, 2006)  (First published by Writers Workshop India )
"True picture of the Indian workplace" - Book Review India, vol 30 No 7 July 6

 His writing also appears alongside luminaries like Khushwant Singh and Pritish Nandy in Lessons on Lessons  - a collection of essays on the insights gained from the biographical work Lessons by P. Lal

References

External links
 Author's home page at CricketCountry
 Author's home page at Scoreline

1973 births
Living people
Indian male novelists
Cricket historians and writers